Staroyapparovo (İśke Yappar) is a rural locality (a selo) in Kazangulovsky Selsoviet, Davlekanovsky District, Bashkortostan, Russia. The population was 242 as of 2010. There are 4 streets.

Geography 
Staroyapparovo is located 26 km northeast of Davlekanovo (the district's administrative centre) by road. Novoyapparovo is the nearest rural locality.

References 

Rural localities in Davlekanovsky District